was a Japanese alpine, cross-country, and Nordic combined skier who competed in the 1936 Winter Olympics.

In 1936 he participated in the alpine skiing combined event. He finished 46th in the downhill race, in the slalom he was not allowed to start in the second run. At the same Olympics he finished 55th in the 18 km cross-country competition. As a member of the Japanese team he finished twelfth in the first ever held cross-country relay contest. In the Nordic combined event he finished 35th.

External links
 Skiing 1936 
 Nordic Combined Results 1936
 Cross-Country Combined Results 1936
 Tsutomu Sekido's profile at Sports Reference.com

1915 births
1987 deaths
Japanese male alpine skiers
Japanese male cross-country skiers
Japanese male Nordic combined skiers
Olympic alpine skiers of Japan
Olympic cross-country skiers of Japan
Olympic Nordic combined skiers of Japan
Alpine skiers at the 1936 Winter Olympics
Cross-country skiers at the 1936 Winter Olympics
Nordic combined skiers at the 1936 Winter Olympics
20th-century Japanese people